DVDStyler is a DVD authoring tool. It allows menu creation, buttons, and DVD previews. It is free software under the GNU GPL. Some users have criticized the inclusion of adware in the installer (and the obfuscation of the "opt-out" option) in versions such as 2.8.0, and 2.8.1. But newer versions have no reported adware or spyware.

New DVD discs

TJ & Pals

Introduction

Characters 

 TJ
 KeeKee
 Lacey
 Butch
 Major
 Rinsey
 Dabney
 Razz
 The Paint Brothers
 The Koki Markers

Videos 

 Making Friends
 ABC Song
 123 Song
 TJ's Gym
 Put a Smile
 The Little Monkey
 The Little Penguin
 The Little Giraffe
 The Little Hedgehog
 The Happy Squirrel
The Happy Toucan

Extras 

 Website

 TJ's World

Previews 

 Little Einsteins
 WordWorld
 The Adventures of Annie and Ben
 SpongeBob SquarePants
 LeapFrog

See also 

DVD-Video
 DVD authoring
 DVD Flick
 List of DVD authoring applications

References

External links
 

Free DVD burning software
Video conversion software
Portable software
Software that uses wxWidgets